Jaanus Kuum (2 October 1964 – 26 August 1998) was an Estonian-Norwegian racing cyclist. He began cycling exercises in 1978 under the guidance of Helvi and Rein Roos. From 1983 to 1984, he competed four times in trekking and road training as an Estonian champion. In 1984, he moved from Estonia to Norway. He rode in four Grand Tours between 1986 and 1989.

Kuum died at age 33 in Oslo and was interred at Rahumäe cemetery in Tallinn.

Major results

1986
 1st  National Time Trial Championships
 2nd Coppa Sabatini
 5th Overall Coors Classic
1988
 2nd Overall Tour de Luxembourg
 3rd Grand Prix Eddy Merckx
 3rd Overall Vuelta a Aragón
 3rd Overall Vuelta a Asturias
 4th Overall Vuelta a los Valles Mineros
1st Stage 1
 9th Road race, World Road Championships
 10th Overall Paris–Nice
 10th Philadelphia Classic
1989
 2nd Overall Vuelta a Asturias
 8th Paris–Bruxelles
1990
 2nd National Time Trial Championships
 6th Overall Euskal Bizikleta
 9th Overall Vuelta al Pais Vasco

References

External links

1964 births
1998 deaths
Sportspeople from Tallinn
Estonian emigrants to Norway
Estonian male cyclists
Norwegian male cyclists
Burials at Rahumäe Cemetery
Suicides in Norway